Mela Chiraghan or Mela Shalimar ("Festival of Lights") is a three-day annual festival to mark the urs (death anniversary) of the Punjabi poet and Sufi saint Shah Hussain (1538-1599) who lived in Lahore in the 16th century. It takes place at the shrine of Shah Hussain in Baghbanpura, on the outskirts of Lahore, Pakistan, adjacent to the Shalimar Gardens. The festival also used to take place in the Shalimar Gardens, until President Ayub Khan ordered against it in 1958.

The festival used to be the largest festival in the Punjab, but now comes second to Basant. Common peasants, Mughal rulers, the Punjabi Sikh residents and even the British officers during their British Raj
used to show up at this festival. Maharaja Ranjeet Singh (13 Nov 1780-27 June 1839) had high respect for this 16th century sufi saint Shah Hussain. In the early half of the 19th century, during the Sikh ruling period in Punjab, Maharaja Ranjeet Singh used to lead a procession from the Lahore Fort to this festival site.

Gallery

See also
Basant or Basant Kite Festival (Punjab)
Pir Mangho Urs
Urs (Ajmer) in Rajasthan, India
Shah Hussain

References

Urs
Punjabi culture
Culture in Lahore
Punjabi festivals
Festivals in Pakistan
Sufism in Pakistan